Richa Mukherjee is an Indian television actress known for her roles as Uttarā in Mahabharat, Guddi Thakur in Begusarai and Aarti in Mere Angne Mein.

Filmography

Television

References

External links
 

Living people
Indian television actresses
Indian soap opera actresses
21st-century Indian actresses
Year of birth missing (living people)